Mega Long Mall is a shopping centre located in Donggongon, Penampang, Sabah, Malaysia, about 10 kilometres from the Kota Kinabalu city centre. It is the longest shopping mall in Sabah.

Lawsuit
In early 2015, the mall was sued by 102 shop owners from the mall itself for allegedly breaching their sales and purchase agreement.

See also
 List of shopping malls in Malaysia

References

Shopping malls in Sabah